Macau participated in the 16th Asian Games in Guangzhou.

Medalists 

Nations at the 2010 Asian Games
2010
Asian Games